Melanorosaurus (meaning "Black Mountain Lizard", from the Greek melas/, "black", oros/, "mountain" + /, "lizard") is a genus of basal sauropodomorph dinosaur that lived during the Late Triassic period. A herbivore from South Africa, it had a large body and sturdy limbs, suggesting it moved about on all fours. Its limb bones were massive and heavy like the limb bones of true sauropods.

Description 

Melanorosaurus had a skull which measured approximately 250 mm. The snout was somewhat pointed, and the skull was somewhat triangular when seen from above or below. The premaxilla had four teeth on each side, a characteristic of primitive sauropodomorphs. The maxilla had 19 teeth on each side of the jaw.

Discovery and species 
 
The type specimens, syntypes SAM 3449 and SAM 3450, were discovered, described and named in 1924 by Sidney H. Haughton.  They were collected from the Triassic Lower Elliot Formation, dating to the early Norian, on the north slope of the Thaba 'Nyama (Black Mountain) in Transkei, South Africa. The first complete skull referred to Melanorosaurus, NM QR3314, was described in 2007. However, this specimen comes from the Upper Elliot, unlike the Melanorosaurus type material and NM QR1551, rendering its referral to the genus untenable.

Melanorosaurus thabanensis was named in 1993 by Gauffre, based on holotype MNHN LES-16, a femur found in the Upper Triassic lower Elliot Formation. However, a recent review of the material demonstrated that the femur, along with six other bones, can't be referred to the genus Melanorosaurus, and a new combination (Meroktenos thabanensis) was created.

Classification 

Melanorosaurus was once classified as a prosauropod, but Prosauropoda no longer appears to be a natural group. According to some definitions of Sauropoda, Melanorosaurus is an early sauropod. However, these definitions also take in many other former "prosauropods", and Adam Yates has proposed a definition of Sauropoda that will specifically exclude Melanorosaurus (Sauropoda as all sauropodomorphs closer to Saltasaurus than Melanorosaurus). This definition would allow Sauropoda to retain its traditional concept.

The following cladogram shows the position of Melanorosaurus within Massopoda, according to Oliver W. M. Rauhut and colleagues, 2020:

References

Bibliography 
 

Melanorosauridae
Late Triassic dinosaurs of Africa
Triassic South Africa
Fossils of South Africa
Fossil taxa described in 1924
Taxa named by Sidney H. Haughton